The following is the list of squads for each of the 16 teams that competed in the men's basketball tournament at the 1960 Summer Olympics.

Group A

Hungary

The following players represented Hungary:

 Árpád Glatz
 György Pólik
 István Liptay
 János Bencze
 János Greminger
 János Simon
 László Bánhegyi
 László Gabányi
 Miklós Boháty
 Ottó Temesvári
 Tibor Zsíros
 Zoltán Judik

Italy

The following players represented Italy:

 Achille Canna
 Sandro Gamba
 Sandro Riminucci
 Antonio Calebotta
 Augusto Giomo
 Gabriele Vianello
 Gianfranco Lombardi
 Gianfranco Pieri
 Gianfranco Sardagna
 Giovanni Gavagnin
 Mario Alesini
 Paolo Vittori

Japan

The following players represented Japan:

 Hiroshi Saito
 Hideo Kanekawa
 Kaoru Wakabayashi
 Kenichi Imaizumi
 Masashi Shiga
 Yasukuni Oshima
 Setsuo Nara
 Shoji Kamata
 Shutaro Shoji
 Takeo Sugiyama
 Takashi Itoyama
 Takashi Masuda

United States

The following players represented the United States:

 Burdie Haldorson
 Jay Arnette
 Walt Bellamy
 Bob Boozer
 Terry Dischinger
 Darrall Imhoff
 Allen Kelley
 Lester Lane
 Jerry Lucas
 Oscar Robertson
 Adrian Smith
 Jerry West

Group B

Bulgaria

The following players represented Bulgaria:

 Atanas Atanasov
 Emanuil Gyaurov
 Georgi Kanev
 Georgi Panov
 Iliya Mirchev
 Khristo Tsvetkov
 Lyubomir Panov
 Nikolay Ilov
 Petko Lazarov
 Stefan Stoykov
 Tsvetko Slavov
 Viktor Radev

Czechoslovakia

The following players represented Czechoslovakia:

 Bohumil Tomášek
 Bohuslav Rylich
 Boris Lukášik
 Dušan Lukášik
 František Konvička
 Jaroslav Tetiva
 Jiří Baumruk
 Jiří Šťastný
 Jindřich Kinský
 Vladimír Pištělák
 Zdeněk Bobrovský
 Zdeněk Konečný

France

The following players represented France:

 Bernard Mayeur
 Christian Baltzer
 Henri Grange
 Henri Villecourt
 Robert Monclar
 Jean Degros
 Jean-Paul Beugnot
 Jérôme Christ
 Louis Bertorelle
 Max Dorigo
 Philippe Baillet
 Roger Antoine

Yugoslavia

The following players represented Yugoslavia:

Group C

Brazil

The following players represented Brazil:

 Moses Blass
 Waldemar Blatskauskas
 Algodão
 Rosa Branca
 Mosquito
 Boccardo
 Wlamir Marques
 Amaury
 Fernando Brobró
 Sucar
 Jatyr
 Edson Bispo

Mexico

The following players represented Mexico:

 Alberto Almanza
 Armando Herrera
 Carlos Quintanar
 César Herrera
 Eulalio Avila
 Guillermo Torres
 Guillermo Wagner
 Héctor Aizpuro
 Ignacio Chavira
 José María Lozano
 Gayle Bluth
 Urbano Zea

Puerto Rico

The following players represented Puerto Rico:

 Ángel Cancel
 César Bocachica
 Evelio Droz
 John Moráles
 Johnny Rodríguez
 Toñín Casillas
 José Santori
 Juan Vicéns
 Juan Ramón Báez
 Rafael Valle
 José Cestero
 Teófilo Cruz

Soviet Union

The following players represented the Soviet Union:

 Yuri Korneev
 Guram Minashvili
 Valdis Muižnieks
 Cēzars Ozers
 Aleksandr Petrov
 Mikhail Semyonov
 Vladimer Ugrekhelidze
 Maigonis Valdmanis
 Jānis Krūmiņš
 Albert Valtin
 Gennadi Volnov
 Viktor Zubkov

Group D

Philippines

The following players represented the Philippines:

 Alfonso Márquez
 Carlos Badion
 Constancio Ortíz
 Cristobal Ramas
 Ed Ocampo
 Edgardo Roque
 Eddie Pacheco
 Emilio Achacoso
 Kurt Bachmann
 Ciso Bernardo
 Roberto Yburan
 Gerry Cruz

Poland

The following players represented Poland:

 Andrzej Nartowski
 Andrzej Pstrokoński
 Bohdan Przywarski
 Dariusz Świerczewski
 Janusz Wichowski
 Jerzy Młynarczyk
 Jerzy Piskun
 Krzysztof Sitkowski
 Mieczysław Łopatka
 Ryszard Olszewski
 Tadeusz Pacuła
 Zbigniew Dregier

Spain

The following players represented Spain:

 Agustín Bertomeu
 Alfonso Martínez
 Emiliano Rodríguez
 Francisco Buscató
 Jesús Codina
 Joaquín Enseñat
 Jorge Guillén
 José Luis
 José Nora
 Juan Martos
 Miguel González
 Santiago Navarro

Uruguay

The following players represented Uruguay:

 Carlos Blixen
 Danilo Coito
 Edison Ciavattone
 Héctor Costa
 Manuel Gadea
 Milton Scaron
 Nelson Chelle
 Raúl Mera
 Sergio Matto
 Waldemar Rial
 Washington Poyet
 Adolfo Lubnicki

References

1960 Summer Olympics